When Pomegranates Howl is a 2020 Afghan-Australian drama film written and directed by an Iranian director Granaz Moussavi. The film was partly funded through Adelaide Film Festival, which became its premiere place. It was selected as the Australian entry for the Best International Feature Film at the 94th Academy Awards.

Plot
Based on real events, the film tells a story of Hewad, a nine-year-old boy who lives on the streets in the capital of Afghanistan - Kabul. Following the loss of both his father and brother, Hewad decides to create a business by working as a cart pusher, which he enjoys doing every day. By working as such, and loading the carts with goods, he travels throughout Kabul in hope to raise enough money for his family. Hewad's dream of becoming a movie star comes to life when he stumbles on an Australian photographer.

Cast
Arafat Faiz
Elham Ayazi
Andrew Quilty

Production and filming
Granaz Moussavi started filming When Pomegranates Howl in Kabul, Afghanistan in 2017 after reading Australian headlines of an attack by the Australian armed forces in which two boys - 11 and 12-year-olds were killed. This sad news, prompted the director to write a script about a (back then) nine-year-old boy named Hewad.

Accolades

|-
!scope=row|2021
|Granaz Moussavi
|14th Asia Pacific Screen Awards
|

See also
 List of submissions to the 94th Academy Awards for Best International Feature Film
 List of Australian submissions for the Academy Award for Best International Feature Film

References

External links

2020 films
Afghan drama films
Australian drama films
Pashto-language films
Films set in Afghanistan